Heliobolus neumanni, also known commonly as Neumann's sand lizard, is a species of lizard in the family Lacertidae. The species is endemic to East Africa.

Geographic range
H. neumanni is found in Ethiopia, Kenya, and Tanzania.

Etymology
The specific name, neumanni, is in honor of German ornithologist Oscar Neumann.

Habitat

Reproduction
H. neumanni is oviparous.

References

Further reading
Broadley DG, Howell KM (1991). "A Check List of the Reptiles of Tanzania, with Synoptic Keys". Syntarsus 1: 1–70. (Heliobolus neumanni, new combination, p. 18).
Largen, Malcolm; Spawls, Stephen (2010). The Amphibians and Reptiles of Ethiopia and Eritrea. Frankfurt am Main, Germany: Edition Chimaira / Serpents Tale. 687 pp. .
Spawls, Stephen; Howell, Kim; Hinkel, Harald; Menegon, Michele (2018). Field Guide to East African Reptiles, Second Edition. London: Bloomsbury Natural History. 624 pp. .
Tornier G (1905). "Schildkröten und Eidechsen aus Nordost-Afrika und Arabien. Aus Carlo v. Erlanger's und Oscar Neumann's Forschungreise ". Zoologische Jahrbücher. Abteilung für Systematik, Geographie und Biologie der Tiere 22: 365–388. (Eremias neumanni, new species, pp. 376–377). (in German).

Heliobolus
Lacertid lizards of Africa
Reptiles of Ethiopia
Reptiles of Kenya
Reptiles of Tanzania
Reptiles described in 1905
Taxa named by Gustav Tornier